Walter Hall may refer to:

Walter Hall (golfer) (born 1947), United States golfer, winner of 1997 The BelfryM PGA Seniors Championship
Walter Allan Hall (1867–1944), Canadian politician
Walter Hall (British politician) (1891–1980), soldier and British Member of Parliament
Walter Merrill Hall (1888–1980), American tennis player
Walter Phelps Hall (1884–1962), Dodge Professor of History at Princeton University
Walter Russell Hall (1831–1911), Australian businessman and donor to medical research
Walter Hall (cricketer) (1861–1924), English cricketer

See also
Walter Halls (1871–1953), British trade unionist and politician